The 1951 Cork Senior Hurling Championship was the 62nd staging of the Cork Senior Hurling Championship since its establishment by the Cork County Board in 1887. The draw for the opening round fixtures took place at the Cork Convention on 21 January 1951. The championship began on 8 April 1951 and ended on 7 October 1951.

Glen Rovers were the defending champions.

On 7 October 1951, Sarsfields won the championship following a 5-8 to 3-7 defeat of Glen Rovers in the final. This was their first championship title ever.

Micka Brennan was the championship's top scorer with 9-01.

Team changes

To Championship

Promoted from the Cork Intermediate Hurling Championship
 Carrigtwohill

Results

First round

Second round

 Carbery received a bye in this round.

Semi-finals

Final

Championship statistics

Top scorers

Top scorers overall

Top scorers in a single game

Miscellaneous

 For the first time since 1931, the championship was won by a team other than Glen Rovers or St. Finbarr's.
 Sarsfields win their first title after losing four finals.

References

Cork Senior Hurling Championship
Cork Senior Hurling Championship